Chandos Leigh Hunt Wallace (born Emily Honoria Leigh Hunt; 1854 – 16 March 1927) was an English healer and writer on health, spiritualism and food reform. She was an entrepreneur and activist for vegetarianism, as well as an advocate for temperance and anti-vaccination.

Biography 
Wallace was born in London in 1854; she was the grandniece of Leigh Hunt.

Wallace worked as a lay healer, claiming that spiritual faith and purity were the best means of healing disease. She was trained by her future husband Joseph Wallace, who she met at a phrenological meeting held by James Burns. They married in 1878; the couple had seven children. Wallace set up her own practice in London which employed a number of assistants; patients were treated with a combination of "dietary control, hydropathy, physical manipulation and mesmerism".

In 1877, Wallace carried out a national lecture tour, where she spoke at multiple spiritualist societies. She completed a novel in 1879, Visibility Invisible and Invisibility Visible, which was serialised by James Burns. In 1890 Wallace took over the ownership of T. L. Nichols' journal Herald of Health; she later become its editor.

Wallace died on 16 March 1927 in Missenden, Buckinghamshire.

Selected publications 
 A Treatise on All Known Uses of Organic Magnetism (1876)
 Vaccination Brought Home to the People (1876)
 Practical Instructions in the Science and Art of Organic Magnetism
 Flesh Eating a Fashion
 Visibility Invisible and Invisibilty Visible (1879)
 Dietetic Advice to the Young & Old (1884)
 Physianthropy: Or, the Home Cure and Eradication of Disease (with Joseph Wallace; 1885)
 366 Menus: Each consisting of a soup, a savoury course, a sweet course, a cheese course, and a beverage, with all their suitable accompaniments, for every day in the year, no dish or beverage being once repeated, all arranged according to the season, and without the introduction of fish, flesh, fowl, or intoxicants with a cook's guide for the production of the dishes (1885)
 Private Instructions in the Science and Art of Organic Magnetism (1885)
 Visibility Invisible and Invisibility Visible (1888)
 Salt in Its Relation to Health & Disease (1913)

References 

1854 births
1927 deaths
19th-century English businesspeople
19th-century English businesswomen
19th-century English women writers
20th-century English businesspeople
20th-century English businesswomen
20th-century English women writers
20th-century English writers
Alternative medicine activists
Anti-vivisectionists
British anti-vaccination activists
British hypnotists
British vegetarianism activists
English health and wellness writers
English magazine editors
English pamphleteers
English spiritualists
English temperance activists
Folk healers
Lecturers
Publishers (people) from London
Vegetarian cookbook writers
Women cookbook writers
Writers from London